The Father of Columbus Baseball is a bronze sculpture depicting Harold Cooper by Alan Hamwi, installed outside Huntington Park (whose predecessor stadium was in named in his honor for) in Columbus, Ohio's Arena District, in the United States. The statue was unveiled in 2009.

See also
 2009 in art

References

2009 establishments in Ohio
2009 sculptures
Arena District
Bronze sculptures in Ohio
Downtown Columbus, Ohio
Monuments and memorials in Ohio
Outdoor sculptures in Columbus, Ohio
Sculptures of men in Ohio
Statues in Columbus, Ohio